John B. Johnson (October 15, 1868 – June 26, 1940), more commonly referred to as J. B. Johnson, was an American attorney and politician who served as the 22nd Florida Attorney General.

Early life and military service 
Johnson was born in Live Oak, Florida, on October 15, 1868. On April 23, 1898, Johnson enlisted in the United States Army during the Spanish–American War. He served as a first sergeant in Company L of the 1st Florida Infantry. His regiment did not see any combat, remaining in Tampa, Florida, and later Huntsville, Alabama, for the majority of the war. Johnson was mustered out of the Army on December 3, 1898.

Educated in local schools, Johnson was admitted to the Florida Bar in 1903, and began a private practice in Live Oak.

Political career 

In 1907, Johnson, a Democrat,  was elected as the mayor of Live Oak. He was simultaneously elected to the Florida Senate, representing District 27, which encompassed Suwanee County. While in the senate, Johnson opposed legislature regulating child labor, and, as a fervent Methodist, he was a supporter of women's suffrage.

In 1913, Johnson was appointed for a one-year term as the President pro tempore of the Florida Senate by Senate President Ion L. Farris, and later in 1917, he would become the President of the Florida Senate, serving for only that year. Johnson did not seek reelection to either the senate or the mayoral office in 1922, opting to return to private practice.

In 1925, Johnson was appointed as the 23rd Florida Attorney General by newly elected Governor John W. Martin, succeeding Rivers Buford, who Martin had appointed to the Florida Supreme Court. Johnson served as the Florida Attorney General until Martin appointed him as the judge of the Second Judicial Circuit Court of Florida.

Personal life and death 
Johnson died in Live Oak on June 26, 1940. He is buried in the Live Oak Cemetery. Johnson was married to Mary Wagner on 1902. They were married until her death in 1923 and had two children with her: Wagner B. and John Paul.

Johnson was a member of the Freemasons.

References 

1868 births
1940 deaths
Florida Attorneys General
People from Live Oak, Florida
United States Army soldiers
American military personnel of the Spanish–American War
Military personnel from Florida
Methodists from Florida
American suffragists
Presidents of the Florida Senate
Democratic Party Florida state senators
American judges
20th-century American judges
American Freemasons
Mayors of places in Florida